Jordyn Woods (born September 23, 1997) is an American model, socialite, and singer. She is known for her role in the reality television show Life of Kylie.

Early life
Jordyn Woods was born in Los Angeles on September 23, 1997, to John Woods, a television sound engineer, and Elizabeth Woods, a talent and brand manager.  She has two brothers named John Jr. and Joshua, and a sister named Jodie. She was raised in  a predominantly white neighborhood in Oak Park, California and remembers being one of only two black girls at her school. Woods' parents later divorced, and she moved around frequently, eventually deciding to do homeschooling after her family moved to Calabasas, California when she was thirteen. Woods' father died from cancer when she was nineteen.

Her father worked on The Fresh Prince of Bel-Air, and her family is close with Will Smith and Jada Pinkett Smith, who she considers her uncle and aunt.

Woods modeled briefly as a child.

Career

Modeling 
Woods was signed to Wilhelmina in 2015 after an agent discovered her on Instagram and asked if she was interested in modeling. In May 2016, Woods walked her first runway in the Lane Bryant and Christian Siriano fashion show. Woods was a model for Khloé Kardashian's clothing company, Good American, from 2016 until 2019.

In 2017, Woods walked in her first New York Fashion Week show. She appeared on the September 2019 issue of Cosmopolitan UK.

Television 
Woods starred in all episodes of the 2017 reality television show Life of Kylie, and also appeared in some episodes of Keeping Up with the Kardashians. Woods was also a celebrity guest on the 2019 season of VH1's Hip Hop Squares. Woods competed in season three of The Masked Singer as "Kangaroo".

Woods made her acting debut in 2019 on an episode of grown-ish, in which she played Dee. Her character was living in a dorm and contemplating suicide, and the resident director worked to bring awareness to black mental health on campus. She later appeared on the BET+ film Sacrifice  and had a leading role in a 2020 BET+ film Trigger as Vanessa Mass.

Business ventures 
In August 2018, Woods launched her own size-inclusive activewear line, SECNDNTURE.

In September 2018, Kylie Cosmetics launched the Kylie x Jordyn collection, a collaboration between the two friends. In June 2019, Woods launched a clothing line with Boohoo.com.

In July 2019, Woods starred in Rick Ross's music video. In October 2019, Woods launched a hair extensions line with Easilocks.

In October 2020, Woods collaborated with PrettyLittleThing, creating the Quarantine Collection.

In 2021, Woods launched her fitness and wellbeing app called FRSTPLACE.
She created the app to help her community start putting themselves first,
improve their  mental and physical wellbeing. The app provides fitness plans created by expert trainers, and recipes by top nutritionists.

Personal life
Woods has been open about her struggle with her body image and the impact that growing up in Hollywood had on her self-image.

Woods had a highly publicized friendship and lived with Kylie Jenner until February 2019 and often helped Jenner take care of her daughter, Stormi Webster. 

In May 2020, Woods began dating basketball player Karl-Anthony Towns. She rents a house in Los Angeles.

Filmography

As herself

As actress

References

External links

1997 births
Living people
African-American female models
Female models from California
Instagram accounts
21st-century African-American women